This is a partial list of public art in Monaco. It includes statues, memorials, monuments, and contemporary works of visual art on public display.

Images may be missing from this list, due to no freedom of panorama provision in the copyright law of Monaco for public artworks.

By ward

Fontvieille

Larvotto

La Condamine

Monaco-Ville

Monte-Carlo

References

Arts in Monaco
Monaco
Tourist attractions in Monaco
Monaco-related lists